Worthington Township may refer to the following townships in the United States:

 Worthington Township, Nobles County, Minnesota
 Worthington Township, Richland County, Ohio